Local elections in Imo State in Nigeria were held on 12 March 2022. Elections were held across the 27 local government areas and 305 INEC wards across the state to elect local Government Councils and Chairmen.

Background 
In 2021, Governor Hope Uzodinma announced his intention to hold local elections in accordance with the State Independent Electoral Commission.

Results 
All seats were won by the All Progressives Congress.

References

See also 

Imo State local elections
March 2022 events in Nigeria
2022 local elections in Nigeria